Eric Pohlmann (born Erich Pollak; 18 July 1913 – 25 July 1979) was an Austrian theatre, film and television character actor who worked mostly in the United Kingdom. He is known for voicing Ernst Stavro Blofeld, the primary antagonist of the James Bond series, in the films From Russia with Love and Thunderball.

Early life 
Born in Vienna, Austria-Hungary, Pohlmann was a classically trained actor who studied under the renowned director Max Reinhardt. He appeared at the Raimund Theater, and supplemented his income by working as an entertainer in a bar.

In 1939, he followed his fiancée and later wife, actress Lieselotte Goettinger (best known in the UK for playing the concentration camp guard in the war films, Odette and Carve Her Name With Pride), into exile in London. Until mid-1941, both were kept in an internment camp. After their release, Eric took part in propaganda broadcasts against the Nazis on the BBC World Service. In order to earn a living, the Pohlmanns temporarily took positions in the household of the Duke of Bedford, Lieselotte as a cook and Eric, as he was now known, as butler.

Career 
After the war, he began a career on the London stage. Among other roles he played "Peachum" in Bertolt Brecht and Kurt Weill's The Threepenny Opera. From the end of the 1940s, Pohlmann was often present in film and television productions, taking supporting roles in various adventure and crime films, and appearing occasionally in comedies. His large frame and massive features typecast him in roles as master criminals and spies, or conversely as police officers or detectives, as well as other figures of authority. He was frequently cast in "foreign" roles, portraying Turks, Italians, Arabs, Greeks or Asians; he also played King George I, King George II in Disney's Rob Roy, the Highland Rogue and King George III twice.

One of his earliest film appearances was in Carol Reed's classic The Third Man (1949). He also played supporting roles in such British films as They Who Dare (1954), Chance of a Lifetime (1950), Reach for the Sky (1956), and Expresso Bongo (1960). He also appeared in US productions, notably Moulin Rouge (1952), Mogambo (1953), Lust For Life (1956) and 55 Days at Peking (1963). Twice he appeared in films directed by Richard Thorpe and starring Robert Taylor – The Adventures of Quentin Durward (1955) and The House of the Seven Hawks (1959).

He displayed his comedic talents in films like Gentlemen Marry Brunettes (1955) with Jane Russell, as a lecherous Arab sheikh in The Belles of St. Trinian's (1954), as "The Fat Man" in Carry On Spying (1964) and in The Return of the Pink Panther (1975).

Pohlmann (uncredited) also provided the voice of the unseen head of SPECTRE, Ernst Stavro Blofeld, in the James Bond films From Russia with Love (1963) and Thunderball (1965).

In the 1960s and 1970s, Pohlmann relaunched his German-speaking career in German and Austrian film and television productions. In 1962, Pohlmann also appeared in The Puzzle of the Red Orchid starring Marisa Mell, Christopher Lee and Klaus Kinski, a German film adaptation of an Edgar Wallace novel.

His many roles in Austrian TV's acclaimed production of Friedrich Torberg's 'Tante Jolesch' established Pohlmann as a major star in his home country.

Pohlmann's greatest success in German TV drama came in 1970 with an adaptation of Wilkie Collins' novel The Woman in White, one of the most successful television productions of the year which gained over 9 million viewers. Under the direction of William Semmelroth, Pohlmann appeared in the role of the villainous Count Fosco, alongside Heidelinde Weis, Christoph Bantzer, Pinkas Braun and Helmut Käutner. The mini-series has a cult following to this day.

Pohlmann was a regular on British television, taking the role of "Inspector Goron" in the 1952-1954 TV series Colonel March of Scotland Yard with Boris Karloff, and appearing as a guest star in such series as The Saint, The Champions, The Avengers, Danger Man, Department S, Jason King  and Paul Temple.

In 1978, he worked with the actor-director Maximilian Schell in an Austro/German film production of Ödön von Horváth's play Geschichten aus dem Wienerwald (Tales from the Vienna Woods). The film was shown at the 1979 London Film Festival. In that year, during final rehearsals for his second appearance at the Salzburg Festival, Pohlmann suffered a heart attack, and died the same day in a hotel in Bad Reichenhall. He was 66. He was survived by his children and his second wife, Lili Stern-Pohlman, a Polish-born Holocaust survivor.

In 2006, the Turner Classic Movies "31 Days of Oscar" festival was based on the theme of "360 Degrees of Oscar" (based on the game of "Six Degrees of Kevin Bacon") in which TCM chooses an actor who has played a significant role in Oscar history, and builds its entire schedule around him. They chose Eric Pohlmann.

He also appeared on stage in, amongst other productions, Henry Cecil's Settled Out of Court and Jean Anouilh's 'Point of Departure'.

Filmography

References

External links 

1913 births
1979 deaths
20th-century Austrian male actors
Austrian expatriates in the United Kingdom
Austrian male film actors
Austrian male stage actors
Austrian male television actors
Male actors from Vienna